Mandamus River is a river in the South Island of New Zealand.

The headwaters are on the southern side of the Organ Range and it feeds into the Hurunui River  due west of Culverden.

References

Rivers of Canterbury, New Zealand
Rivers of New Zealand